Rhein-Erft-Kreis I is an electoral constituency (German: Wahlkreis) represented in the Bundestag. It elects one member via first-past-the-post voting. Under the current constituency numbering system, it is designated as constituency 91. It is located in western North Rhine-Westphalia, comprising most of the Rhein-Erft-Kreis district.

Rhein-Erft-Kreis I was created for the inaugural 1949 federal election. Since 2013, it has been represented by Georg Kippels of the Christian Democratic Union (CDU).

Geography
Rhein-Erft-Kreis I is located in western North Rhine-Westphalia. As of the 2021 federal election, it comprises the entirety of the Rhein-Erft-Kreis district excluding the municipalities of Brühl, Erftstadt, and Wesseling.

History
Rhein-Erft-Kreis I was created in 1949, then known as Köln-Land. In the 1976 through 2009 elections, it was named Erftkreis I. It acquired its current name in the 2013 election. In the 1949 election, it was North Rhine-Westphalia constituency 6 in the numbering system. In the 1953 through 1961 elections, it was number 65. From 1965 through 1976, it was number 58. From 1980 through 1998, it was number 57. From 2002 through 2009, it was number 92. Since the 2013 election, it has been number 91.

Originally, the constituency was coterminous with the district of Landkreis Köln. It acquired its current borders in the 1980 election. The Erftkreis district was renamed Rhein-Erft-Kreis in 2003, but the constituency's borders did not change.

Members
The constituency was first represented by Aloys Lenz of the Christian Democratic Union (CDU) from 1949 to 1969. The Social Democratic Party (SPD)'s candidate Rudi Adams won it in 1969 and served until 1980. He was succeeded by fellow SPD member Klaus Lennartz until 2002. Gabriele Frechen of the SPD then served from 2002 to 2009. Willi Zylajew of the CDU was elected in the 2009 election and served a single term. Georg Kippels was elected in 2013, and re-elected in 2017 and 2021.

Election results

2021 election

2017 election

2013 election

2009 election

References

Federal electoral districts in North Rhine-Westphalia
Rhein-Erft-Kreis
1949 establishments in West Germany
Constituencies established in 1949